Herri Batasuna (HB) was a far-left Basque nationalist coalition in Spain. It was founded in 1978 and defined itself as abertzale, left-wing, socialist, and supported the independence of the Greater Basque Country. It was refounded as Batasuna in 2001 and subsequently outlawed by the Spanish Supreme Court for being considered the political wing of the separatist group Euskadi Ta Askatasuna (ETA).

History
The party was founded in April 1978 as Herri Batasuna, a coalition of leftist nationalist political groups initially brought together to advocate for "No" in the referendum to be held that year on the Spanish constitution.

Its constituent parties had been called together by senior Basque nationalist Telesforo de Monzón in a 1978 meeting called "The table of Alsasua". Herri Batasuna's founding convention was held in Lekeitio, home of Santiago Brouard, who was then the leader of HASI (Herriko Alderdi Sozialista Iraultzailea or Revolutionary Socialist People's Party). The party won 150,000 votes in the Basque Country (15%) and 22,000 additional votes in Navarre (9%) in its first Spanish general election in March 1979. Thus, they won three seats in the Spanish Parliament, which they did not occupy. The same happened in 1980 in the first elections to the Basque Parliament, in which HB stood as a second political force, with 151,636 votes (16.55%), winning 11 seats. Its absence allowed a BNP-only Basque government led by Carlos Garaikoetxea. On 20 November 1984, Brouard was assassinated by two members of the GAL. The killing is perhaps the only one performed by the GAL death squad within Spain itself.

Another well-known Herri Batasuna leader, Josu Muguruza, was also killed by members of the neo-fascist Bases Autónomas in 1989, while he was in a hotel in Madrid. He was a congressman in the Spanish Parliament when he was assassinated.

Electoral performance
Since its foundation, Herri Batasuna ran for every election in the Basque Country and in Navarre, as well as in Spanish general elections (from 1979 to 1996) and the European elections of 1987, 1989 and 1994. In the 2000 Spanish general election, it supported abstention. In the elections held from 1998 to 2001 it was part of the coalition Euskal Herritarrok.

Herri Batasuna refused to participate in many of the institutions it won seats in, with the exception of local town halls.

Spanish general elections

References

Bibliography
 

 
Political parties in the Basque Country (autonomous community)
Banned secessionist parties
Banned socialist parties
Basque conflict
Basque history
Political parties established in 1978
Political parties disestablished in 2001
Politics of Spain
Pro-independence parties
Secessionist organizations in Europe
Socialist parties in Spain
1978 establishments in Spain
Political parties in Navarre
Banned political parties in the Basque Country (autonomous community)
Organisations based in Bilbao